The United States ambassador to France is the official representative of the president of the United States to the president of France. The United States has maintained diplomatic relations with France since the American Revolution. Relations were upgraded to the higher rank of Ambassador in 1893. The diplomatic relationship has continued through France's two empires, three monarchies, and five republics. Since 2006 the ambassador to France has also served as the ambassador to Monaco.

List of United States chiefs of mission in France

Ministers to the Court of Versailles (1778–1792) 

Relations between the United States and the French Court of Versailles were established in 1778 with the signing of the Treaty of Amity and Commerce.  As a republic, the United States was not entitled to send an ambassador. Instead, relations were maintained at the lower diplomatic rank of Minister. The position was formally known as the Minister Plenipotentiary from the United States of America at the Court of Versailles.

Ministers to the First Republic (1792–1804) 

Diplomatic relations were broken in 1796 due to French anger at U.S. neutrality in the War of the First Coalition.  After the Directory refused to accept Charles Cotesworth Pinckney's credentials, a commission was appointed to negotiate with the French Republic.  The members of the commission — Pinckney, John Marshall, and Elbridge Gerry — were all accredited with the rank of Envoy Extraordinary and Minister Plenipotentiary.  French officials demanded a bribe before they would commence negotiations, scuttling the mission in the XYZ Affair.  Hostilities culminated in the outbreak of the Quasi-War between the U.S. and France.  Diplomatic relations were restored with the Convention of 1800.

James Monroe was accredited Minister Plenipotentiary to the French Republic in 1803 to negotiate the Louisiana Purchase. However, Robert Livingston remained chief of mission.

Ministers to the Court of the Tuilleries (1804–1848) 

Since Versailles had been stripped of its furnishings during the French Revolution, Napoleon I returned the French court to its pre-1682 home at the Tuilleries. U.S. ministers to all future French monarchs would be accredited to the Tuilleries. After the Congress of Vienna standardized the system of diplomatic ranks, the United States continued to send a Minister, who was officially credentialed as an Envoy Extraordinary and Minister Plenipotentiary.

Ministers to the Second Republic (1848–1852)

Ministers to the Court of the Tuilleries (1852–1870)

Ministers to the Third Republic (1870–1893)

Ambassadors to the Third Republic (1893–1942) 

After it became a republic, France continued to exchange ambassadors with other Great Powers. This put an end to the longstanding rule that only Great Power monarchies could exchange ambassadors with each other. As the United States grew in population and economic strength, it followed the French example. In 1893, the United States upgraded its diplomatic relations with the other Great Powers to the ambassadorial level.

Ambassadors to the Fourth Republic (1944–1961)

Ambassadors to the Fifth Republic (1961–present)

See also

 List of French ambassadors to the United States
 Embassy of the United States, Paris
 France – United States relations
 Foreign relations of France
 Ambassadors of the United States

References

Further reading
 Willson, Beckles. America's Ambassadors to France (1777-1927): A Narrative of Franco-American Diplomatic Relations (1928).

External links
 United States Embassy in Paris official site
 United States Department of State: France
 United States Department of State: Chiefs of Mission for France
 United States Department of State: Background notes on France
 Interview with 1984 U.S. Ambassador to France from the Dean Peter Krogh Foreign Affairs Digital Archives

 
France
Lists of ambassadors to France